The Felixstowe F.2 was a 1917 British flying boat class designed and developed by Lieutenant Commander John Cyril Porte RN at the naval air station, Felixstowe during the First World War adapting a larger  version of his superior Felixstowe F.1 hull design married with the larger Curtiss H-12 flying boat. The Felixstowe hull had superior water contacting attributes and became a key base technology in most seaplane designs thereafter.

Design and development
Before the war Porte had worked with American aircraft designer Glenn Curtiss on a flying boat, America in which they intended to cross the Atlantic in order to win the £10,000 prize offered by the British Daily Mail newspaper for the first aircraft to cross the Atlantic. Following the outbreak of war in Europe, Porte returned to England and rejoined the Royal Navy, eventually becoming commander of the naval air station at Felixstowe where he recommended the purchase from Curtiss of an improved version of the America flying boat on which he had worked, the Curtiss H-4 type, resulting in the RNAS receiving two prototype Americas and 62 H-4s.

The Curtiss H-4 was found to have a number of problems, being both underpowered and having a hull too weak for sustained operations and having poor handling characteristics when afloat or taking off.  One flying boat pilot, Major Theodore Douglas Hallam, wrote that they were "comic machines, weighing well under two tons; with two comic engines giving, when they functioned, 180 horsepower; and comic control, being nose heavy with engines on and tail heavy in a glide."

To try to resolve the H-4's hydrodynamic issues, in 1915 Porte carried out a series of experiments on four H-4s fitted with a variety of modified hulls, using the results of these tests to design a new  hull which was fitted to the wings and tail of an H-4, serial number 3580, with a pair of 150 hp (112 kW) Hispano-Suiza 8 engines as the Felixstowe F.1.  Rather than the lightweight boat-type structure of the Curtiss boats, the F.1's hull was based around a sturdy wooden box-girder similar to that used in contemporary landplanes, to which were attached a single-step planing bottom and side sponsons.  Once modified by the fitting of a further two steps, the new hull proved to give much better take off and landing characteristics and was much more seaworthy.

Porte then designed a similar hull, for the larger Curtiss H-12 flying boat, which while larger and more capable than the H-4s, shared failings of a weak hull and poor water handling. The combination of the new Porte II hull, this time fitted with two steps, with the wings of the H-12, a new tail and powered by two Rolls-Royce Eagle engines was named the Felixstowe F.2; its first flight was in July 1916, proving greatly superior to the Curtiss on which it was based. The F.2 entered production as the Felixstowe F.2A, being used as a patrol aircraft, with about 100 being completed by the end of World War I. Another seventy were built, and these were followed by two F.2C which were built at Felixstowe.

In February 1917, the first prototype of the Felixstowe F.3 was flown.  This was larger and heavier than the F.2, giving it greater range and heavier bomb load, but poorer agility.  Approximately 100 Felixstowe F.3s were produced before the end of the war.

The Felixstowe F.5 was intended to combine the good qualities of the F.2 and F.3, with the prototype first flying in May 1918.  The prototype showed superior qualities to its predecessors but the production version was modified to make extensive use of components from the F.3, in order to ease production, giving lower performance than either the F.2A or F.3.

Operational history
The Felixstowe F.2A was used as a patrol aircraft over the North Sea until the end of the war. Its excellent performance and maneuverability made it an effective and popular type, often fighting enemy patrol and fighter aircraft, as well as hunting U-boats and Zeppelins.  The larger F.3, which was less popular with its crews than the more maneuverable F.2A, served in the Mediterranean and the North Sea.

The F.5 did not enter service until after the end of World War I, but replaced the earlier Felixstowe boats (together with Curtiss flying boats) to serve as the RAF's standard flying boat until being replaced by the Supermarine Southampton in 1925.

Variants
F.2A: Based on Curtiss H12 with new hull.  Powered by two 345 hp Rolls-Royce Eagle VIII engines. 4 to 7 machine guns and 460 lb of bombs.
F.2B: F.2A with an open cockpit.
F.2C:  Modified F.2A with lighter hull.  Two built.

Operators

Chilean Air Force - received one F.2A in 1920. Still operational in 1924.

Royal Netherlands Naval Air Service - one in service (N4551), receiving serial L-2

Royal Naval Air Service
Royal Air Force
No. 228 Squadron RAF
No. 230 Squadron RAF
No. 231 Squadron RAF
No. 232 Squadron RAF
No. 234 Squadron RAF
No. 240 Squadron RAF
No. 247 Squadron RAF
No. 249 Squadron RAF
No. 257 Squadron RAF
No. 259 Squadron RAF
No. 261 Squadron RAF
No. 267 Squadron RAF

United States Navy

Specifications (F.2A)

See also

Notes

Bibliography
 Bruce, J.M. "The Felixstowe Flying-Boats: Historic Military Aircraft No. 11, Part 1." Flight, 2 December 1955, pp. 842–846.
 Bruce, J.M. "The Felixstowe Flying-Boats: Historic Military Aircraft No. 11, Part 2." Flight, 16 December 1955, pp. 895–898.
 Bruce, J.M. "The Felixstowe Flying-Boats: Historic Military Aircraft No. 11, Part 3." Flight, 23 December 1955, pp. 929–932.
 Bruce, J.M. British Aeroplanes 1914-18. London: Putnam, 1957.
 Hallam, T.D. The Spider Web: The Romance of a Flying Boat War Flight. London: William Blackwood, 1919. 
 London, Peter. British Flying Boats. Stroud, UK: Sutton Publishing, 2003. .
 Rivas, Santiago. British Combat Aircraft in Latin America. Manchester, UK: Crécy Publishing, 2019. .
 Thetford, Owen. British Naval Aircraft since 1912. London: Putnam, Fourth edition 1978. .

External links

Pigeons and Seaplanes: Film of carrier pigeons used to send messages from British seaplanes in the North Sea during the First World War, including the Felixstowe F.2, c.1917.
Felixstowe Flying-Boats

1910s British patrol aircraft
Flying boats
F.2
Biplanes
Aircraft first flown in 1916
Twin piston-engined tractor aircraft